Local elections were held in Graz on 25 November 2012. In addition to the People's Party, the Communists, the Social democrats, the Freedom Party and the Greens also the Pirates  got seats in the municipal council. The Alliance for the Future of Austria lost its 2 seats from 2008.

Source: http://www.graz.at/cms/ziel/4787925/DE/

Graz local election
Graz
Local elections in Austria
Graz local election